Kunde is a Germanic surname with origins in Bohemia and Silesia. It is borne by individuals in Germany, Austria, Switzerland, the Netherlands, the Scandinavian countries, the United States, Australia and other countries. Individuals mentioned in ancient chronicles include Cuntz der Kuentzel of Kempten who lived around 1382, and Cuncze von Cracow who lived in Liegnitz, Silesia in 1388.

Identically or similarly-spelled but non-derivative surnames are found in India and various African countries.. Kunde is also one of the surnames of Maratha community which hails from Maharashtra, a state of India.

List of persons with the surname
Al Kunde, stage name of Emil Joseph Kunde (1887–1952), American boxer and screen actor
Anne Kunde (1895–1960), American screen actress
Diana Kunde, American newspaper columnist formerly with the Dallas Morning News
Emmanuel Kundé (born 1956), Cameroonian former professional football defender
Eugene R. Kunde (born 1942), American corporate executive with Epson America
Gerald Ralph Kunde II (born 1965), American real estate association executive
Gregory Kunde (born 1954), American operatic tenor
Herbert Edward Kunde (1911–1997), American Red Cross and Defense Department official
James Erhardt Kunde (1937–2009), former city manager of Dayton, Ohio
Jesper Kunde, Danish businessman and author
Karl-Heinz Kunde (1938–2018), former German cyclist
Kevin Kunde (born 1974), Veterinarian/owner "Marion Animal Hospital", owner "Extreme Bowhunting" ranch Brackettville, TX
Pierre Kunde, another Cameroonian footballer
Virgil G. Kunde, American astrophysicist with NASA
Wilhelm Kunde, German Gestapo officer during World War II

See also
Kunde (disambiguation)

References